Richard Johnson is an American gossip columnist with the New York Posts Page Six column, which he edited for 25 years. Described by the New York Times as "a journalistic descendant of Walter Winchell", in 1994 he was ranked the No. 1 New York City gossip columnist by New York magazine in a list that also included Liz Smith, Michael Musto, and Cindy Adams.

Early life

Johnson was raised in Greenwich Village, New York, the son of a magazine editor father and a mother who worked in public relations. He attended the University of Colorado, Boulder, and later Empire State College, New York, from which he received a communications degree. His first newspaper work was with the Chelsea-Clinton News.

NY Post
He joined the New York Post in 1978 as a general-assignment reporter, and took charge of Page Six after the departure of editor Susan Mulcahy. He worked briefly for the New York Daily News & The Observer in the 1990's. He left the Post in 2010 to work in Los Angeles for Rupert Murdoch's startup The Daily, and returned in 2013. After returning to Page Six, he later retired in 2019 after serving for nearly four decades.

NY Daily News
Since 2021 he has been writing a weekly gossip column for the NY DailyNews.

Personal life
He was previously married to Nadine Johnson, a New York City publicist. In 2006 he married Sessa von Richthofen. He has 3 children, artist Damon Johnson with his first wife Patty Costick, Jack Johnson with Nadine Johnson, and Alessandra Johnson with Sessa von Richthofen.

References

External links
Richard Johnson's columns at Page Six
Richard Johnson's columns at NY Daily News

American gossip columnists
Living people
New York Post people
Writers from New York City
Empire State College alumni
1954 births